The 1954–55 Ranji Trophy was the 21st season of the Ranji Trophy. Madras won the title defeating Holkar in the final.

Zonal Matches

North Zone

East Zone

Central Zone

West Zone

South Zone

Inter-Zonal Knockout matches

Final

Scorecards and averages
Cricketarchive

References

External links

1955 in Indian cricket
Indian domestic cricket competitions